Flatwood is a soil series with impaired drainage that occurs in the southeastern United States. Flatwood soils are upland soils formed from marine sediments. A shallow water table plays a role in soil formation; typically the water table is only a few feet deep and fluctuates during the year.  Flatwood soils are classified in USDA soil taxonomy as fine, mixed, semiactive, mesic Aquic Hapludults.

See also
Ultisols

References 

Pedology
Types of soil
Soil in the United States